Richards House may refer to:

in the United States
(by state, then city/town)

Richards Mansion (Wheat Ridge, Colorado), listed on the National Register of Historic Places (NRHP) in Jefferson County, Colorado
Richards Mansion (Georgetown, Delaware), NRHP-listed
Richards-Hamm House, Glendale, Kentucky, listed on the NRHP in Hardin County, Kentucky 
Richards-Murray House, Glendale, Kentucky, listed on the NRHP in Hardin County, Kentucky 
Laura Richards House, Gardiner, Maine, listed on the NRHP in Kennebec County, Maine
Thomas Richards House, Rising Sun, Maryland, NRHP-listed
Theodore W. Richards House, Cambridge, Massachusetts, NRHP-listed
Ellen Swallow Richards House, Jamaica Plain, Boston Massachusetts, NRHP-listed
James Lorin Richards House, Newton, Massachusetts, NRHP-listed
Alfred H. Richards House, Quincy, Massachusetts, NRHP-listed
Claflin-Richards House, Wenham, Massachusetts, NRHP-listed
Oconee Station and Richards House, Walhalla, South Carolina, NRHP-listed
Richards Cabins, Faith, South Dakota, listed on the National Register of Historic Places in Perkins County, South Dakota
Newton Copeland Richards House, Memphis, Tennessee, listed on the NRHP in Shelby County, Tennessee
Richards-Sewall House, Urbana, Ohio, NRHP-listed
Richards House (Farmington, Utah), listed on the National Register of Historic Places in Davis County, Utah
Zalmon Richards House, Washington, D.C., NRHP-listed

See also
Richards Mansion (disambiguation)